Linda Douglas (18 November 1965) is an Australian rhythmic gymnast.

Douglas competed for Australia in the rhythmic gymnastics individual all-around competition at the 1984 Summer Olympics in Los Angeles. There she was 33rd (last) in the preliminary (qualification) round and did not advance to the final.

References

External links 
 Linda Douglas at Sports-Reference.com

1965 births
Living people
Australian rhythmic gymnasts
Gymnasts at the 1984 Summer Olympics
Olympic gymnasts of Australia